Edaga Arbi is a town in the Tigray Region of Ethiopia, 42 km south east of Adwa. It is the administrative and economic center of the Werie Lehe woreda. Edega Arbi is mainly known for its monastery.

Populated places in the Tigray Region